The Clarkson Cup is a women's ice hockey trophy, which from 2009 to 2019 was awarded to the winner of the Canadian Women's Hockey Championship (CWHL champion). With the folding of the Canadian Women's Hockey League (CWHL) in 2019, the Cup has not been awarded since. Like the Stanley Cup and Canada's Jeanne Sauvé Memorial Cup, it was named after a former Governor General of Canada, Adrienne Clarkson.

Though initially awarded in 2006 to the Canadian national women's hockey team, it was intended to be awarded to the top women's club in Canada. From 2006 to 2008, it was not awarded, owing to rights issues between Clarkson, Hockey Canada, and the artists responsible for making the trophy. From 2009, the Clarkson Cup was awarded, as intended, to the top women's club team. In Canada it was considered to be the cultural equivalent of the men's Stanley Cup for Canadian women's ice hockey.

History

Origins
When the 2004–05 NHL season was cancelled because of lockout, the Stanley Cup was not awarded for the first time since the 1918-19 Spanish flu pandemic.  In February 2005, Adrienne Clarkson proposed that since the Stanley Cup was to be awarded to the best professional ice hockey team of the year (even though there were Canadian teams in the American Hockey League, which plays for the Calder Cup), it should be awarded to the best women's hockey team because they were still playing. That idea was brought to Susan Fennell, who was the Commissioner of the National Women's Hockey League (NWHL) and also the Mayor of the Canadian city of Brampton.  In a media interview, Fennell commented that while the women had great respect for the Stanley Cup, it belonged to men's ice hockey, and that the women actually did have a cup of their own, but simply one with no name. Fennell then came up with the idea that the Governor General should consider lending her name to the women's hockey championship cup, as Lord Stanley had done years before for the men's hockey championship.  Clarkson was thrilled with the idea and later met with Fennell at Rideau Hall, where it was agreed that the women's hockey championship trophy would be named the Clarkson Cup.

Originally, the NWHL Championship Cup was to have a new name placed on it. However, On September 14, 2005, Clarkson announced the creation of a new trophy for women's hockey.

The Clarkson Cup is made of silver and was designed by Nunavut Arctic College in Iqaluit.  Canadian silversmith Beth M. Biggs was commissioned to make the Clarkson Cup.  She designed and built the sterling trophy and collaborated with three Inuit artists: Okpik Pitseolak, Therese Ukaliannuk, and Pootoogook Qiatsuk. The Inuit artists designed some of the decoration on the trophy.  There are images of the goddess Sedna (one of the most powerful figures in Inuit tradition), Arctic animals, ancient masks, and the flowers of the provinces and territories of Canada.  The actual cup portion of the trophy is not much bigger than a large coffee mug.

Early problems
The trophy was awarded to the Canadian national women's hockey team on July 10, 2006, with the expectation that Hockey Canada would take over the trophy and how it was to be awarded.  However, complications arising due to the rights to the trophy (Clarkson wanting full rights to the trophy from the artists in order to turn the trophy over to Hockey Canada, while the artists wanting Hockey Canada to instead license the Cup in order to collect royalties from its use) and the splintered top level of women's club hockey at the time resulted in the trophy not being awarded for three years.

At the time of the creation of the Clarkson Cup, there were two top professional women's hockey leagues in Canada: the National Women's Hockey League in Eastern Canada and the Western Women's Hockey League in Western Canada (with one team from Minnesota) — the latter being formed from two former NWHL teams (the Calgary Oval X-Treme and Edmonton Chimos) due to travel costs, with no interleague championships to determine a true national champion.  Though the two leagues were expected to merge in 2007 (with the five-team WWHL being absorbed into the 11-team NWHL as a new "western division"), logistics differences (due to playoff scheduling) made the merger impossible — the WWHL playoffs were finished before the Esso Women's Nationals, while the NWHL playoffs had yet to begin (and would not conclude until after the Nationals and the world championships).  The NWHL folded at the conclusion of the 2006–07 season, with the Canadian Women's Hockey League taking its place.  Though the CWHL and WWHL agreed on a format that would determine a national champion (to be decided with each league sending its two best teams to the Esso Women's Nationals, with the intent that it would be split off as a separate tournament from the senior women's tournament in the future), the Clarkson Cup remained unavailable — the Abby Hoffman Cup would be awarded in its place until the Clarkson Cup became available.

2009 to present
In March 2009, Clarkson and the artists behind the Clarkson Cup settled their licensing dispute, allowing the trophy to be presented.  The inaugural Canadian National Women's Hockey Championship was held later that month, at the K-Rock Centre in Kingston, Ontario, featuring an identical format to that used for the Esso Women's Nationals the previous year for club teams.  The Montreal Stars, champions from the East, prevailed over the Minnesota Whitecaps in the finals of the championship, which also saw the Brampton Canadettes-Thunder and the Calgary Oval X-Treme participate.  Clarkson was on hand to present the trophy to the Stars upon their victory. Like the first Stanley Cup champion of 1893, the first Clarkson Cup champions come from Montreal.

On August 6, 2010, the "Clarkson Cup" trademark application that Adrienne Clarkson filed on July 21, 2006, matured into a registered trademark.

The Canadian Women's Hockey League discontinued operations May 1, 2019, after 12 seasons of operations.

Design

The trophy consists of a Loving cup with the coat of arms of former Governor General Adrienne Clarkson.

The pedestal is engraved with hockey masks and base engraved with flowers of each province in Canada.

There are several bands attached that have the names and years of each winning team.

Champions

The championship game was not played in the home town of any of the CWHL teams, but at a neutral site.

Appearances

A bolded year denotes a Clarkson Cup win.

All-time leaderboard

All-time leading scorers (2009 to 2015)

All-time leaders in shutouts (2009 to 2015)

See also

 List of sports awards honoring women
List of awards presented by the Governor General of Canada
List of awards named after Governors General of Canada
Viceregal eponyms in Canada

References

External links
 Governor general creates 'Clarkson Cup' (CBC)

 
Hockey Canada
Women's ice hockey competitions in Canada
Western Women's Hockey League
Canadian Women's Hockey League
Ice hockey trophies and awards
Sports awards honoring women